Ancylistes transversus is a species of beetle in the family Cerambycidae. It was described by Fairmaire in 1905.

References

Ancylistes
Beetles described in 1905